Shmuel Kaminetsky (born 1965) is an Israel-born rabbi and has been the rabbi of Dnipro and Dnipropetrovsk Oblast since 1990.

Biography 
Shmuel Kaminetsky's parents emigrated from the USSR to Israel due to religious persecution in 1946. Kaminetsky was born in Kfar Chabad Israel, in 1965 

He believes that genuine Jewish identity and Ukrainian nationalism can not only be combined, but also complement each other, and this should serve as an example for many.

References

External links 
 official biography
 Chief Rabbi of the Dnieper Shmuel Kaminetsky received an award from the Dnipropetrovsk Regional Council

1965 births
Living people
Ukrainian Orthodox rabbis
20th-century Ukrainian rabbis
21st-century Ukrainian rabbis
People from Kfar Chabad
People from Dnipro